Elandré Huggett is a South African rugby union player who last played for the  in the Pro14, the  in the Currie Cup and the  in the Rugby Challenge. His usual position is hooker.

Career

He was named in a Varsity Cup Dream Team at the conclusion of the 2015 Varsity Cup tournament which played one match against the South Africa Under-20s in Stellenbosch, scoring a try in the match.

He joined Welkom-based side  in 2013. He was a key member of their 2014 Currie Cup First Division-winning side. He played in the final and helped the Griffons win the match 23–21 to win their first trophy for six years.

References

South African rugby union players
Rugby union hookers
Living people
Rugby union players from Cape Town
1991 births
Free State Cheetahs players
Griffons (rugby union) players
Cheetahs (rugby union) players
RC Narbonne players